Aplanodema lomii is a species of beetle in the family Cerambycidae, and the only species in the genus Aplanodema. It was described by Stephan von Breuning in 1938.

References

Beetles described in 1938
Theocridini